Sound City Studios is a recording studio in Los Angeles, California, known as one of the most successful in popular music. The complex opened in 1969 in the Van Nuys neighborhood of Los Angeles. The facility had previously been a production factory of the English musical instrument manufacturer Vox. Throughout the late twentieth century, the studio became known for its signature sound, especially in recording drums and live performances of rock bands.

Dozens of rock artists spanning five decades have recorded at Sound City, including Johnny Cash, Neil Young, Fleetwood Mac, Elton John, Tom Petty and the Heartbreakers, Bob Dylan, Guns N' Roses, Nirvana, Red Hot Chili Peppers, Metallica, Slayer, Rage Against the Machine, Death Cab for Cutie, and Fall Out Boy. Over one-hundred albums recorded at Sound City have achieved gold and platinum certifications.

The studio leased time for public use until 2011; in 2011 the owners closed the studio and much of the equipment was sold off.  From 2011 to 2016, the studio was leased by Fairfax Recordings, who used it as their own exclusive in-house studio.  In 2017 the studio was re-opened for public use and has continued to host artists in the years since. The complex was the focus of the documentary Sound City (2013), directed by musician Dave Grohl.  Grohl purchased some of the equipment sold in 2011, including the rare Neve Electronics 8028 mixing console that has been credited with creating the "Sound City sound"; it has since been re-installed at Grohl's Studio 606.

History
The studio was created by Joe Gottfried and Tom Skeeter, who wanted to start a record company and get into artist management. After a rough start, Skeeter and Gottfried purchased   a state-of-the-art recording console for $75,175 from the English electronics engineer Rupert Neve: "One of four in the world ... a 28-input, 16-bus, 24-monitor 8028 with 1084 EQs and no automation".

The first song recorded on the console was performed by Buckingham Nicks and led to an invitation to join Fleetwood Mac.

During 1969, Sound City hosted the David Briggs productions Twelve Dreams of Dr. Sardonicus by Spirit and After the Gold Rush by Neil Young. Cult leader Charles Manson recorded in Studio B months before the Manson Family crime spree.

In the 1970s, Neil Young, Dr. John, Spirit, Crazy Horse, and Nitty Gritty Dirt Band, along with other bands, recorded music at the studio. Shelter Records founders Leon Russell and Denny Cordell found a home at Sound City as well, recording Leon Russell, Delaney & Bonnie, and Joe Cocker. Thanks to the Shelter founders, Sound City hosted a young band from Florida named Mudcrutch in 1974, providing an introduction to Tom Petty and the Heartbreakers that resulted in a relationship spanning over two decades.

In 1976, Fleetwood Mac recorded one track at the studio, "Never Going Back Again", from what would become one of the highest selling and most critically acclaimed albums of all time, Rumours.

During the 1980s and 1990s, the studio was used to produce works from Tom Petty and the Heartbreakers, Rick Springfield, Ronnie James Dio, Foreigner, The Black Crowes, and Nirvana. Producer Rick Rubin chose Sound City Studios to record artists like Red Hot Chili Peppers and Johnny Cash (1996's Unchained). He also recorded Metallica's Death Magnetic, which entered the Billboard Top 200 chart at No. 1, at the studio.

Joe Gottfried died in 1992, at the age of 65. Tom Skeeter died on 12 September 2014, at the age of 82. The studio was  closed to the public in 2011 and much of the equipment sold off, including the Neve Electronics 8028 Console from Studio A which was purchased by Dave Grohl, former Nirvana drummer and current frontman of Foo Fighters, who installed it in his Studio 606 in Northridge, California.

In 2011, record label Fairfax Recording leased Studio A for exclusive use of its artists  While the studio was left untouched, the control room was refurbished and analog recording equipment even older than the Neve console was added including an ARP 2600 semi-modular analog synthesizer, a Wurlitzer 140B electric piano and EQ modules designed for the Columbia CBS Studios in New York. Artists such as the Cold War Kids, and The Lumineers recorded at the facility during the Fairfax years.

In early 2017 a partnership was formed between Sandy Skeeter, daughter of founder Tom Skeeter, and Olivier Chastan in order to reopen the studio. Sound City is now the home of two of just 11 surviving Helios Type 69 consoles and continues to use classic analog recording techniques in many of its productions. While the control rooms received some upgrades, including Pro Tools, the main studio remains exactly as it was built in 1969.

Sound
Sound City Studios prides itself on having a very particular sound when it comes to recording drums. Toto drummer Jeff Porcaro insisted that one only had to set up the drums in order to get a good drum sound. Producer Rick Rubin said that "guitars sound pretty much the same everywhere, but drums change from room to room, and the sound at Sound City was among the best". Producer Greg Fidelman recorded the sound of a bass drum from each of the big recording studios in the Los Angeles area, subsequently playing the sample for Metallica without divulging from which studio the sound had originated. Based upon this sample, the band chose Sound City Studios to record Death Magnetic. In addition, when asked by Nine Inch Nails to be a guest drummer on some songs, Dave Grohl agreed only if the songs were to be recorded at Sound City Studios. The interior of the main studio has allegedly never been painted over, nor its linoleum tiles changed, due to fear that any such change would directly affect the "legendary sound quality" of the room.

Discography

See also 
 Comparison of analog and digital recording

References

External links
Official Sound City Studios website
Official Sound City Studios Facebook page
Sound City Studios discography at Discogs

1969 establishments in California
Buildings and structures in the San Fernando Valley
Companies based in Los Angeles
Entertainment companies based in California
Entertainment companies established in 1969
Mass media companies established in 1969
Recording studios in California
Van Nuys, Los Angeles